Kalapathar is a village in the Bankura district, West Bengal, India. It is near the Shilabati River, the channel from Mukutmanipur, and a small unnamed stream.

According to the 2020 census, there are 536 people in Kalapathar.

References

Villages in Bankura district